Outside Man may refer to:

 The Outside Man, a 1972 French film
 "Outside Man" (CSI: NY), an episode of CSI: NY